is an EP release by Japanese band The Gazette released on March 30, 2004. The first press edition came housed in a special case, the outer part being a slipcase and the inner part containing the disc and booklet in a disc holder.

Track listing

Notes
Madara was reissued in 2005.
"Sumire" was only featured on the first pressings of the album. The reissue contains only 5 songs.

References

The Gazette (band) albums
2004 EPs